The streaked miner bee (Calliopsis zebrata) is a species of miner bee in the family Andrenidae. It is found in North America.

Subspecies
These two subspecies belong to the species Calliopsis zebrata:
 Calliopsis zebrata bobbae (Rozen, 1958)
 Calliopsis zebrata zebrata

References

Further reading

 
 

Andrenidae
Articles created by Qbugbot
Insects described in 1878
Hymenoptera of North America